The Kul Sharif Mosque located in Kazan Kremlin, was reputed to be – at the time of its construction – one of the largest mosques in Russia, and in Europe outside of Istanbul.

History
Originally, the mosque was built in the Kazan Kremlin in the 16th century. It was named after Kul Sharif, who was a religious scholar who served there. Kul Sharif died with his numerous students while defending Kazan from Russian forces in 1552 during the Siege of Kazan, and the mosque was destroyed by Ivan the Terrible's forces. It is believed that the building featured minarets, both in the form of cupolas and tents. Its design was traditional for Volga Bulgaria, although elements of early Renaissance and Ottoman architecture could have been used as well.

Several countries contributed to the fund that was set up to rebuild Kul Sharif Mosque, namely Saudi Arabia, and United Arab Emirates. Nowadays the mosque predominantly serves as a museum of Islam. At the same time during the major Muslim celebrations thousands of people gather there to pray.

The Kul Sharif complex was envisioned to be an important cornerstone of Kazan's architectural landscape. Besides the main mosque building it includes a library, publishing house and Imam's office.

See also 
Islam in Russia
List of mosques in Russia
List of mosques in Europe

References

External links

Kul Sharif video
Kul Sharif mosque on "Russian mosques"
Kul Sharif Mosque (Kazan)

21st-century mosques
Mosques completed in 2005
Mosques in Kazan
Mosques in Russia
Sunni mosques